Eugen Schnalek (17 March 1911 – 1944/1945) was an Austrian cyclist. He competed in the individual and team road race events at the 1936 Summer Olympics. He was killed during World War II.

References

External links
 

1911 births
1940s deaths
Austrian male cyclists
Olympic cyclists of Austria
Cyclists at the 1936 Summer Olympics
Place of birth missing
Austrian military personnel killed in World War II